Krasnoye is a rural locality (a selo) and the administrative center of Zaborskoye Rural Settlement, Tarnogsky District, Vologda Oblast, Russia. The population was 457 as of 2002. There are 6 streets.

Geography 
Krasnoye is located 23 km west of Tarnogsky Gorodok (the district's administrative centre) by road. Goryayevskaya is the nearest rural locality.

References 

Rural localities in Tarnogsky District